Saint-Léon-le-Grand, Quebec may refer to:

Saint-Léon-le-Grand, Mauricie, Quebec, in Maskinongé Regional County Municipality
Saint-Léon-le-Grand, Bas-Saint-Laurent, Quebec, in La Matapédia Regional County Municipality